Paweł Kaczorowski (born 22 March 1974 in Zduńska Wola) is a Polish former footballer who has previously played for the Polish Ekstraklasa clubs Lech Poznań, Legia Warsaw, Wisła Kraków, and Śląsk Wrocław. He is currently a youth team coach for the Norwegian 3rd tier club Hallingdal FK. Besides Poland, he has played in Norway.

International 
Kaczorowski has made 14 appearances for the Poland national football team, scoring one goal.

Career statistics

International goals
Scores and results list. Poland's goal tally first.

References

External links

1974 births
Living people
Polish footballers
Poland international footballers
KSZO Ostrowiec Świętokrzyski players
Lech Poznań players
Polonia Warsaw players
Legia Warsaw players
Wisła Kraków players
Śląsk Wrocław players
Warta Poznań players
Tur Turek players
People from Zduńska Wola
Sportspeople from Łódź Voivodeship
Association football defenders